The 2010 Copa Latina was second edition of the annual women's volleyball tournament, organized by the Peruvian Volleyball Federation and Frecuencia Latina, played by four countries from June 3-5, 2010 in Lima, Peru.

Competing Nations

Purpose
 send the national junior team (U20) as preparation for the 2010 Junior South American Volleyball Championship
 send the national junior team (U20) as preparation for the 2010 Junior South American Volleyball Championship
 participated in the tournament to test a new team.
 participated in the tournament as general preparation for the team.

Round-Robyn
This edition of the tournament featured only a Round-Robyn system of matches, the team with the most points at the end of the round was declared the winner.

|}

Matches

|}

Final standing

References

P
V
Volleyball